Babadıl Creek is a creek in Turkey.
 
The headwaters are in the mid range of Toros Mountains. It is an irregular flow rate creek with the maximum flow in the spring. It is used in the irrigation of agricultural land around.

References

Rivers of Turkey
Rivers of Mersin Province
Gülnar District
Mediterranean Sea